Monalysa Maria Alcântara Nascimento (born 24 January 1999) is a Brazilian model and beauty pageant titleholder, who was crowned Miss Brasil 2017, becoming the first representative from Piauí and the third woman of Afro-Brazilian origin to win the crown. She represented Brazil at Miss Universe 2017, where she placed in the top ten.

Life and career
Alcântara was born in Teresina, Piauí. She began modeling at age fourteen, and is a university student studying business administration and fashion.

Pageantry
Alcântara began her pageant career after being crowned Miss Teen Piauí 2016, at age seventeen. She went on to represent Piauí at the Miss Teen Brazil 2016 pageant, where she was a runner-up. The following year, Alcântara was crowned Miss Piauí 2017. She represented Piauí in the Miss Brasil 2017 competition, and was crowned the winner, becoming the first woman from Piauí and third Afro-Brazilian to win the crown. She represented Brazil at the Miss Universe 2017 in Las Vegas where she made the Top 10.

References

External links

1999 births
Brazilian beauty pageant winners
Brazilian female models
Afro-Brazilian female models
Living people
Miss Brazil winners
Miss Universe 2017 contestants
People from Teresina